Harold Steinbrenner (born December 3, 1969) is an American businessman best known as the Chairman and Managing General Partner of Yankee Global Enterprises, which owns the New York Yankees of Major League Baseball and minority shares of American soccer club New York City Football Club of Major League Soccer and Italian soccer club AC Milan of Serie A. He and his siblings inherited control of the team from their father, George Steinbrenner, who died in 2010.

Biography

Family and education
Hal Steinbrenner is the younger son of George (1930–2010) and Elizabeth Joan Steinbrenner (nee Zieg) (1935–2018). He has two sisters, Jessica Steinbrenner and Jennifer Steinbrenner (formerly Swindal). He is the younger brother of Hank Steinbrenner, who died in 2020.

Steinbrenner attended Culver Military Academy and went on to graduate from Williams College in 1991 with a Bachelor of Arts degree. He then earned a Master of Business Administration at the University of Florida in 1994.

Professional career
Starting in 2007, George Steinbrenner gradually ceded day-to-day control of the Yankees to Hal and his other son, Hank, as his health worsened. Hal Steinbrenner was elected Chairman of the Board of Yankee Global Enterprises on September 28, 2007.

On November 20, 2008, Major League Baseball owners approved the shift of day-to-day control of the Yankees from father George Steinbrenner to Hal Steinbrenner.

On August 30, 2022, Steinbrenner acquired a minority share of Italian soccer club AC Milan.

Other roles
Hal Steinbrenner is Chairman and CEO of Steinbrenner Hotel Properties and is on the board of directors of the Boys and Girls Club of Tampa Bay.

Personal life
Steinbrenner is a pilot. He owns a GTO single-engine and a Cessna high-wing plane. 

He is married to Cristina DiTullio, a native of Staten Island, New York. Steinbrenner has a daughter named Katherine (b. 1998) with his first wife Christina Lavery, whom he divorced in 2007.

References

1969 births
Living people
New York Yankees owners
New York City FC
A.C. Milan
Major League Baseball executives
Major League Baseball owners
Major League Soccer owners
Warrington College of Business alumni
Williams College alumni
People from Marshall County, Indiana
Steinbrenner family
Culver Academies alumni
American people of German descent
American people of Irish descent